Daniela de Jong (born 1 September 1998) is a Swedish handball player for SCM Râmnicu Vâlcea and the Swedish national team.

She represented Sweden at the 2021 World Women's Handball Championship.

Achievements 
Swedish Handball League:
Gold medalist: 2021
Swedish Handball Cup:
Gold medalist: 2022

References

External links
 Daniela de Jong at European Handball Federation

1998 births
Living people
Swedish female handball players
Handball players from Stockholm